Kau Kee Restaurant is a noodle restaurant in Hong Kong. Its speciality is beef brisket soup with noodles. On his website, the television food personality Andrew Zimmern has noted, "If I had only one meal in all of Hong Kong, it would be at Kau Kee." Writer Mark Rozzo described Kau Kee as "the noodle shop with perhaps the biggest cult following in the world."

References

External links
Kau Kee Restaurant on Openrice.com

Restaurants in Hong Kong
Companies with year of establishment missing
Noodle restaurants